Werner Schindler (February 13, 1905 – 1986) was a Swiss architect. In 1948 he won a silver medal together with Edy Knupfer in the art competitions of the Olympic Games for their "Projekt ETS Magglingen, Eidgenössische Turn- und Sportschule" ("Swiss Federal Sports and Gymnastics Training Centre").

References

External links
 profile

1905 births
1986 deaths
Olympic silver medalists in art competitions
20th-century Swiss architects
Medalists at the 1948 Summer Olympics
Olympic competitors in art competitions